Dr. Robert G. Darling working in the White House Medical Unit, as the first board-certified emergency medicine physician. He provided both primary care and protective medical support services to President Clinton, Vice President Gore, their immediate families and other senior White House officials at the White House and while they traveled all over the world. During this time Dr. Darling administered emergency and preventative medical services in over 40 countries, including numerous undeveloped regions and third-world countries with limited medical services. He practiced aboard Air Force One, Marine One and other official aircraft. He also worked with the U.S. Secret Service in the preparation for unconventional weapon attacks against the President and the creation of chemical, biological, radiological and nuclear defense (CBRNE) training and readiness programs.

On November 6, 1998, Darling facilitated the first of only two emails ever sent by President Bill Clinton during his presidency. This email was sent to John Glenn aboard the Space Shuttle Discovery from Dr. Darling's personal Toshiba Satellite laptop computer.

Darling is currently the chief medical officer of Patronus Medical Group, a concierge healthcare practice.

Books
Associate editor, Ciottone's Disaster Medicine, 2nd Edition.  Elsevier-Mosby.  Philadelphia.  2016
Ciottone GR, Darling RG, Anderson PD, et al.; eds.  Disaster Medicine.  Philadelphia, Pa:  Elsevier; 2006.
Darling RG, Mothershead JL, Waeckerle JF, Eitzen EM Jr; eds.  Emergency Medicine Clinics of North America, Bioterrorism. Vol. 20(2).  Philadelphia, Pa: WB Saunders Company; 2002.

Peer-reviewed articles
Darling RG, Waeckerle JF, Grabenstein JD, Koenig KL.  "Removing health care workers from clinical duties after smallpox vaccination: is it really necessary?"
Cieslak TJ, Pavlin JA, Noah DL, Dire DJ, Stanek SA, Kortepeter MG, Jarrett DG, Pastel RH, Darling RG, et al. "Nuclear, biological and chemical medical defense training as a model for planners".
Darling RG, Catlett CL, Huebner KD, et al., "Threat syndromes in bioterrorism I:  CDC category agents".
Noah DL, Huebner, KD, Darling RG, Waeckerle JF,. "The history and threat of biological warfare and terrorism".

References 

Year of birth missing (living people)
Living people
United States Navy captains
United States Navy Medical Corps officers
Physicians to the President